Joey Ghazal (born September 15, 1978) is a Canadian restaurateur and founder of Fighterbrands Holdings Ltd, Pine Tree State Trading Co and The MAINE. Ghazal has developed, owned and managed notable restaurant and bar concepts in  Beirut,  Dubai and London. He has been recognized by Caterer Magazine as "Middle East Restaurateur of the Year".

Background and education
Born in Montreal, Canada, and raised in Dubai, Ghazal graduated from Dubai College in 1995 as a theater and history major. He holds a bachelor's degree in political science from Concordia University in Montreal, Canada.

Career
Ghazal started his career in 1998 at the young age of 18 as a busboy at "La Queue de Cheval Steakhouse & Bar" in Montreal. He worked his way up the ranks from waiter to Assistant restaurant manager, to Director of Marketing for the "Morentzos Restaurant Group" (MRG)  owned by Peter Morentzos.

Joey Ghazal spent three years living in London between 1999 and 2003 where he studied Film Production and Scriptwriting at "Raindance Studios" and while working for the Soho House.

After leaving MRG in 2009, Joey moved to Beirut, Lebanon, where he created, owned and operated four unique concepts:  "Cro Magnon Steakhouse & Bar" and "St. Elmo’s Seaside Brasserie on Zaitunay Bay", "The Angry Monkey" which was franchised to Dubai's Stereo Arcade Complex in 2013 and "Brgr Co".

In 2013 Ghazal moved back to Dubai to establish "Fighterbrands Holding Ltd" a creative agency that develops, owns and manages restaurant and bar concepts. In 2014 Ghazal established "Pine Tree State Trading Co" a BVI company that owns "The MAINE Oyster Bar & Grill", Dubai's first homegrown New England Seaside Brasserie.

In 2017 Ghazal created "Barbary Deli & Cocktail Club" a clandestine parisian inspired cocktail bar.

Awards 
Ghazal was awarded ‘Middle East Restaurateur of the Year for 2018’ by Caterer Magazine. He is also listed in the yearly ‘Power 50’ issue as the "4th Most Powerful Independent Restaurateur" in the Middle East.

References

Canadian restaurateurs
1978 births
Canadian company founders
Living people